Harvey Limón (born July 21, 1975) is a Surinamese professional footballer who plays as midfielder for Groene Ster Heerlerheide

External links
 

Living people
1975 births
Surinamese footballers
Suriname international footballers
SVB Eerste Divisie players
S.V. Leo Victor players
Association football midfielders